The Public Image is a novel published in 1968 by Scottish author Muriel Spark and shortlisted for the Booker Prize the following year.

It is set in Rome and concerns Annabel Christopher, an up-and-coming film actress. Annabel carefully cultivates her image to keep her career on course, managing to mask her lack of talent. Her husband Frederick loathes her manipulations and her inexplicable success. He plans his final revenge on her accordingly.

References

External links
Study Guide

1968 British novels
Novels by Muriel Spark
Novels about actors
Novels set in Rome
Macmillan Publishers books